Marc-Antoine Eidous (c.1724 – c.1790) was a French writer, translator and Encyclopedist born in Marseilles.

His translations included works on the subjects of philosophy, travel and agriculture by English and Scottish authors:

 The Dictionnaire universel de médecine (Paris, 1746–1748, 6 folio volumes) with Denis Diderot, Julien Busson and François-Vincent Toussaint from the Medicinal Dictionary of Robert James
 Reflexions sur l'Origine des Nations, tirées de leur langage, (1750);
 Histoire de la poésie (1764), by John Brown
 Métaphysique de l'âme, ou Théorie des sentiments moraux (1764), translating The Theory of Moral Sentiments (1759) by Adam Smith
 Agriculture complète, ou l'Art d'améliorer les terres (1765) from The whole art of husbandry, or, the way of managing and improving of land (1707) by John Mortimer
 The Voyages depuis S. Pétersbourg en Russie dans diverses contrées de l'Asie...  (1766), from  Travels from St. Petersburg in Russia, to diverse parts of Asia (1764) by John Bell
 The Œuvres philosophiques (Philosophical Works) of Francis Hutcheson
 Dissertation historique et politique sur la population de l'ancien tems comparée ace celle du nôtre (Amsterdam, 1769), from Robert Wallace's A Dissertation on the Numbers of Mankind in Ancient and Modern Times (1753)

Eidous also contributed to the Encyclopédie, including an entry on heraldry (blason'').

References 

1724 births
1790 deaths
18th-century French male writers
18th-century French translators
18th-century French writers
Contributors to the Encyclopédie (1751–1772)
English–French translators
French translators
Latin–French translators
Spanish–French translators
Writers from Marseille